Brott is a surname. Notable people with the surname include: 

Alexander Brott (1915–2005), Canadian conductor
Armin Brott (born 1958), American author
Boris Brott (1944–2022), Canadian conductor
Denis Brott (born 1950), Canadian cellist
Ronna Brott, Canadian judge

Other
Brott Music Festival, annual event in Hamilton, Ontario, Canada